Importin is a type of karyopherin that transports protein molecules from the cell's cytoplasm to the nucleus. It does so by binding to specific recognition sequences, called nuclear localization sequences (NLS).

Importin has two subunits, importin α and importin β. Members of the importin-β family can bind and transport cargo by themselves, or can form heterodimers with importin-α. As part of a heterodimer, importin-β mediates interactions with the pore complex, while importin-α acts as an adaptor protein to bind the nuclear localization signal (NLS) on the cargo. The NLS-Importin α-Importin β trimer dissociates after binding to Ran GTP inside the nucleus, with the two importin proteins being recycled to the cytoplasm for further use.

Discovery
Importin can exist as either a heterodimer of importin-α/β or as a monomer of Importin-β. Importin-α was first isolated in 1994 by a group including Enno Hartmann, based at the Max Delbrück Center for Molecular Medicine. The process of nuclear protein import had already been characterised in previous reviews, but the key proteins involved had not been elucidated up until that point. A 60 kDa cytosolic protein, essential for protein import into the nucleus, and with a 44% sequence identity to SRP1p, was purified from Xenopus eggs. It was cloned, sequenced and expressed in E.coli and in order to completely reconstitute signal dependent transport, had to be combined with Ran(TC4). Other key stimulatory factors were also found in the study.

Importin-β, unlike importin-α, has no direct homologues in yeast, but was purified as a 90-95 kDa protein and found to form a heterodimer with importin-α in a number of different cases. These included a study led by Michael Rexach
and further studies by Dirk Görlich. These groups found that importin-α requires another protein, importin-β to function, and that together they form a receptor for nuclear localization signals (NLS), thus allowing transport into the nucleus. Since these initial discoveries in 1994 and 1995, a host of Importin genes, such as IPO4 and IPO7, have been found that facilitate the import of slightly different cargo proteins, due to their differing structure and locality.

Structure

Importin-α
A large proportion of the importin-α adaptor protein is made up of several armadillo repeats (ARM) arranged in tandem. These repeats can stack together to form a curved shaped structure, which facilitates binding to the NLS of specific cargo proteins. The major NLS binding site is found towards the N-terminus, with a minor site being found at the C-terminus. As well as the ARM structures, Importin-α also contains a 90 amino acid N-terminal region, responsible for binding to Importin-β, known as the Importin-β binding (IBB)domain. This is also a site of autoinhibition, and is implicated in the release of cargo once importin-α reaches the nucleus.

Importin-β
Importin-β is the typical structure of a larger superfamily of karyopherins. The basis of their structure is 18-20 tandem repeats of the HEAT motif. Each one of these repeats contains two antiparallel alpha helices linked by a turn, which stack together to form the overall structure of the protein.
 
In order to transport cargo into the nucleus, importin-β must associate with the  nuclear pore complexes. It does this by forming weak, transient bonds with nucleoporins at their various FG (Phe-Gly) motifs. Crystallographic analysis has shown that these motifs bind to importin-β at shallow hydrophobic pockets found on its surface.

Nuclear protein import cycle
The primary function of importin is to mediate the translocation of proteins with nuclear localization signals into the nucleus, through nuclear pore complexes (NPC), in a process known as the nuclear protein import cycle.

Cargo binding
The first step of this cycle is the binding of cargo. Importin can perform this function as a monomeric importin-β protein, but usually requires the presence of importin-α, which acts as an adaptor to cargo proteins (via interactions with the NLS). The NLS is a sequence of basic amino acids that tags the protein as cargo destined for the nucleus. A cargo protein can contain either one or two of these motifs, which will bind to the major and/or minor binding sites on importin-α.

Cargo transport
Once the cargo protein is bound, importin-β interacts with the NPC, and the complex diffuses into the nucleus from the cytoplasm. The rate of diffusion depends on both the concentration of importin-α present in the cytoplasm and also the binding affinity of importin-α to the cargo. Once inside the nucleus, the complex interacts with the Ras-family GTPase, Ran-GTP. This leads to the dissociation of the complex by altering the conformation of importin-β. Importin-β is left bound to Ran-GTP, ready to be recycled.

Cargo release
Now that the importin-α/cargo complex is free of importin-β, the cargo protein can be released into the nucleus. The N-terminal importin-β-binding (IBB) domain of importin-α contains an auto-regulatory region that mimics the NLS motif.  The release of importin-β frees this region and allows it to loop back and compete for binding with the cargo protein at the major NLS-binding site. This competition leads to the release of the protein. In some cases, specific release factors such as Nup2 and Nup50 can be employed to help release the cargo as well.

Recycling
Finally, in order to return to the cytoplasm, importin-α must associate with a Ran-GTP/CAS (nuclear export factor) complex which facilitates its exit from the nucleus. CAS (cellular apoptosis susceptibility protein) is part of the importin-β superfamily of karyopherins and is defined as a nuclear export factor. Importin-β returns to the cytoplasm, still bound to Ran-GTP. Once in the cytoplasm, Ran-GTP is hydrolysed by RanGAP, forming Ran-GDP, and releasing the two importins for further activity. It is this hydrolysis of GTP that provides the energy for the cycle as a whole. In the nucleus, a GEF will charge Ran with a GTP molecule, which is then hydrolysed by a GAP in the cytoplasm, as stated above. It is this activity of Ran that allows for the unidirectional transport of proteins.

Disease
There are several disease states and pathologies that are associated with mutations or changes in expression of importin-α and importin-β.

Importins are vital regulatory proteins during the processes of gametogenesis and embryogenesis. As a result, a disruption in the expression patterns of importin-α has been shown to cause fertility defects in Drosophila melanogaster.
 
There have also been studies that link altered importin-α to some cases of cancer. Breast cancer studies have implicated a truncated form of importin-α in which the NLS binding domain is missing. In addition, importin-α has been shown to transport the tumour suppressor gene, BRCA1 (breast cancer type 1 susceptibility protein), into the nucleus. The overexpression of importin-α has also been linked with poor survival rates seen in certain melanoma patients.

Importin activity is also associated with some viral pathologies. For instance, in the infection pathway of the Ebola virus, a key step is the inhibition of the nuclear import of PY-STAT1. This is achieved by the virus sequestering importin-α in the cytoplasm, meaning it can no longer bind its cargo at the NLS. As a result, importin cannot function and the cargo protein stays in the cytoplasm.

Types of cargo
Many different cargo proteins can be transported into the nucleus by importin. Often, different proteins will require different combinations of α and β in order to translocate. Some examples of different cargo are listed below.

Human importin genes
Although importin-α and importin-β are used to describe importin as a whole, they actually represent larger families of proteins that share a similar structure and function. Various different genes have been identified for both α and β, with some of them listed below. Note that often karyopherin and importin are used interchangeably. 
 Importin: IPO4, IPO5, IPO7, IPO8, IPO9, IPO11, IPO13
 Karyopherin-α: KPNA1, KPNA2, KPNA3, KPNA4, KPNA5, KPNA6
 Karyopherin-β: KPNB1

See also 
 Karyopherin
 Nuclear localization sequence
 Nuclear pore complex
 Nuclear transport
 Ran (gene)

References

External links 
 
 

Protein families
Transport proteins